Daugherty may refer to:

People with the surname
 Billy Joe Daugherty (1952-2009), American founder and pastor of Victory Christian Center
 Brad Daugherty, American basketball player
 Brad Daugherty, professional poker player
 Chris Daugherty, American construction worker and reality television personality
 Derri Daugherty, American record producer, songwriter, guitarist and singer
 Duffy Daugherty, American football coach
 George Daugherty, American-born conductor and music director
 Gordon Daugherty, American computer scientist
 Harry M. Daugherty (1860-1941), American politician
 Herschel Daugherty, American actor and television director
 James Daugherty, American author and illustrator
 James Alexander Daugherty (1847–1920), politician
 Jay Dee Daugherty, American drummer
 Jennifer Daugherty (1979–2010), Greensburg, Pennsylvania murder victim
 Jerome Daugherty (1849–1914), American Jesuit and president of Georgetown University
 Michael Daugherty, composer
 Patricia Daugherty, American management scientist
 Patrick M. Daugherty (1928-1997), American politician

Places

United States
 Daugherty, Missouri
 Daugherty Township, Beaver County, Pennsylvania
 Dougherty, Rains County, Texas

See also

Dougherty (disambiguation)